Michigan observes Eastern Time, except for four counties and two cities, which observe Central Time.

History

Before time zones were introduced, every place used local observation of the sun to set their clocks, which means they used local mean time, every city different based on their longitude. Detroit used 05:32:11 west of Greenwich and Menominee 05:50:27 west of Greenwich.

Time zones were introduced in the United States in 1883. They were introduced in different years based on local decisions. Michigan adopted Central Standard Time throughout the state effective September 18, 1885. In 1915, Detroit changed to Eastern time, followed by most of the rest of the state in 1931.

In 1967, when the Uniform Time Act came into effect, the Upper Peninsula went under year-round CST, with no daylight saving time. In 1973, the majority of the peninsula switched to Eastern Time; only the four western counties of Gogebic, Iron, Dickinson, and Menominee continue to observe Central Time.

IANA time zone database
The zone for Michigan as given by zone.tab of the IANA time zone database

References

See also
 Time in the United States

Michigan
Geography of Michigan